Clanculus rubicundus is a species of sea snail, a marine gastropod mollusk in the family Trochidae, the top snails.

Description
The height of the shell attains 6 mm, its diameter about the same. The narrowly umbilicated, rubicund shell has a globose-conic shape. Its whorls are rounded, separated by canaliculate sutures and  elegantly granose-cingulate. The umbilicus shows a white, crenate margin. The columella is thick, twisted, incised above, and passes into a thick tooth below. The lip is thickened, sulcate within, and splendidly pearly.

This is a beautiful species, allied to Clanculus corallinus (Gmelin, 1791), but much more slender. The elevated riblets are densely crenate and the interstices canaliculate. The spiral riblets on the penultimate whorl number four, on the last whorl inclusive of the base of the shell, 12 to 14. The color is uniform ruddy or scarlet, variegated with white in the umbilical region.

Distribution
This marine species occurs in the Pacific Ocean off  Fiji in the Viti Levu Group.

References

 Dunker, W. (1871): Mollusca nova Musei Godeffroy Hamburgiensis; Malakozoologische Blätter 18, pp. 150–175

External links
 Systax (Universität Ulm, Ruhr-Universität Bochum): Clanculus rubicundus

rubicundus
Gastropods described in 1871